Maldakal is a Mandal in Jogulamba Gadwal district of Telangana state

Villages
The villages in Maldakal mandal include:
 Adiviravalcheru 	
 Amaravai 	
 Bijjawar 
 Dasaripally
 Kurthiravalcher 	
 Maddelabanda 	
 Maldakal 	
 Mallamdoddi 	
 Nagardoddi
 Neelivanipally 	
 Neethuvanipally 	
 Palwai 	
 Peddadoddi 	
 Peddapally 	
 Saddalonpally 	
 Thatikunta 	
 Uligapally
 Vittalapuram 	
 Yelkur
About the Village : The village is located 18 km from the Gadwal Taluk. This village is very famous for Lord Timmappa Temple, a famous temple in Mahabbobnagar dist. It belongs to The lord Venkateswara. The local people calls the lord as Maldkal Timmappa. He is famous god in around villages. Every year the people celebrates Maldkal Timmappa Jathara (Tirunala) on December Pournami. Devotees from different places like Karnataka & Maharshtra will attend the Jathara. It is an estimation that every year nearly 20 lakh devotees take darsanam. There is a local story related to Tirupati Lord. Balaji with Lord Timmappa.

References

Mandals in Jogulamba Gadwal district
Jogulamba Gadwal district
Villages in Jogulamba Gadwal district